A statue of Henry Lawson Wyatt was installed in Raleigh, North Carolina, United States.

History
The statue was unveiled in 1912 by the North Carolina division of the Daughters of the Confederacy. The statue was removed on June 20, 2020, after North Carolina governor Roy Cooper ordered the removal of all Confederate monuments at the state capitol.

See also

 List of monuments and memorials removed during the George Floyd protests

References

External links
 

1912 establishments in North Carolina
1912 sculptures
Monuments and memorials in the United States removed during the George Floyd protests
Buildings and structures in Raleigh, North Carolina
Confederate States of America monuments and memorials in North Carolina
Outdoor sculptures in North Carolina
Removed Confederate States of America monuments and memorials
Sculptures of men in North Carolina
Statues in North Carolina
Statues removed in 2020